Cadeby (pronounced  ) is a village and civil parish in the Hinckley and Bosworth district of Leicestershire, England, about 6 miles north of Hinckley, close to Newbold Verdon and Market Bosworth.  According to the 2001 census it had a population of 177, reducing to 169 at the 2011 census.

The village's name means 'farm/settlement of Kati' or 'farm/settlement belonging to the boys'.

Cadeby Light Railway

Until 2005, Cadeby Rectory garden was home to the Cadeby Light Railway. This was a short narrow gauge line and collection of railway artifacts belonging to the late Rev. Teddy Boston, a friend of the Rev W Awdry. The railway is closed and was dismantled in 2006.

Cadeby Steam & Country Fayre
Market Bosworth Steam Rally, also known as the Cadeby Steam & Country Fayre, was founded in 1964 by the Rev Teddy Boston, both as an alternative to transporting his steam roller to distant rallies by low-loader, and as a means to raise funds for his parish church.  The rally continued annually for 44 years, held on the second weekend in August; the last rally was held in 2008.

See also
List of steam fairs

References

External links

Cadeby Steam & Country Fayre (official website)
Pictures of "Fiery Elias" - Teddy Boston's Foster traction engine - at Cadeby Steam & Country Fayre

Steam festivals
Villages in Leicestershire
Civil parishes in Leicestershire
Hinckley and Bosworth